Srinivas Wayangankar (born 1 August 1946) was an Indian cricketer. He was a right-handed batsman and right-arm off-break bowler who played for Maharashtra. He was born in Bombay.

Wayangankar made a single first-class appearance for the side, during the 1963-64 season, against Baroda. He did not bat in the match, but bowled two overs, taking figures of 1-7, his single wicket being that of Vijay Indulkar.

External links
Srinivas Wayanagankar at Cricket Archive

1946 births
Living people
Indian cricketers
Maharashtra cricketers